Fjordservice AS is a defunct passenger ferry company that operated routes from Stavanger to Ryfylke in Rogaland, Norway. It operated from 1990 to 2008. The routes operated were Stavanger–Mekjarvik– Kvitsøy, Stavanger–Usken–Hommersåk and Stavanger–Byøyene.

The company was founded in 1990 and started with ferry routes; it was later bought by Rogaland Trafikkselskap (later Stavangerske) and L. Rødne og Sønner. Rogaland Trafikkselskap then bought out Rødne, and in 2008, Stavangerske, Fjordservice and Tide merged. 

Ferry companies of Rogaland
Shipping companies of Norway
Companies based in Stavanger
Transport companies established in 1990
Norwegian companies established in 1990
Transport companies disestablished in 2008
2008 disestablishments in Norway